Etalon-1 and Etalon-2 are geodetic satellites. They are designed to determine, with high accuracy, terrestrial reference frame and earth rotation parameters, to improve the gravity field, and to improve the gravitational constant.  Each satellite is a high-density passive laser reflector in a very stable medium Earth orbit (MEO).

References 

Geodetic satellites
Laser ranging satellites
Russian space probes
Earth observation satellites of the Soviet Union
Spacecraft launched in 1989